Will Allison is an American novelist and editor. He is the author of the New York Times bestselling book Long Drive Home (2011) and What You Have Left (2007).

Personal life 
Allison was born in Columbia, South Carolina. He graduated from Case Western Reserve University in 1991 with a degree in English and political science, and then went on to Ohio State University to receive his MA in English and MFA in creative writing. Allison now lives with his wife and daughter in South Orange, New Jersey.

Career 
Allison is a contributing editor for One Story magazine and has also served as the executive editor of Story and editor-at-large for Zoetrope: All-Story. He has taught creative writing at the Ohio State University, Butler University, and Indiana University-Purdue University at Indianapolis. He is an adjunct assistant professor in Columbia University’s MFA creative writing program.

He has published short fiction in American Short Fiction, Atlanta Magazine, The Cincinnati Review, The Florida Review, Glimmer Train, The Kenyon Review, One Story, Shenandoah, Zoetrope: All-Story, and elsewhere.

External links 
 Will Allison personal website

References

21st-century American novelists
1968 births
Living people
Case Western Reserve University alumni
Ohio State University Graduate School alumni
American male novelists
Writers from Columbia, South Carolina
21st-century American male writers
Novelists from South Carolina